Áine is an Irish goddess of summer, wealth and sovereignty. She is associated with midsummer and the sun, and is sometimes represented by a red mare. She is the daughter of Egobail, the sister of Aillen and/or Fennen, and is claimed as an ancestor by multiple Irish families. As the goddess of love and fertility, she has command over crops and animals and is also associated with agriculture.

Áine is strongly associated with County Limerick. The hill of Knockainey is named after her, and was site of rites in her honour, involving fire and the blessing of the land, recorded as recently as 1879. She is also associated with sites such as Toberanna, County Tyrone; Dunany, County Louth; Lissan, County Londonderry;  and Cnoc Áine near Teelin, County Donegal.

In Irish mythology

Ailill Aulom
In early tales she is associated with the semi-mythological King of Munster, Ailill Aulom, who is said to have raped her, an assault ending in Áine biting off his ear, hence the name Aulom "one-eared". By Old Irish law, only an "unblemished" person can rule; by maiming him this way, Áine rendered him unfit to be king. As an embodiment of sovereignty, she can both grant and remove a man's power to rule. The descendants of Aulom, the Eóganachta, claim Áine as an ancestor.

Gearóid FitzGerald
In other tales Áine is the wife of Gerald FitzGerald, 3rd Earl of Desmond, known popularly as "Iarl Gearóid". Rather than having a consensual marriage, he rapes her (thought to be based on the story of Ailill Aulom), and she exacts her revenge by either changing him into a goose, killing him or both. The FitzGeralds thus claim an association with Áine; despite the Norman origins of the clan, the FitzGeralds would become known for being "More Irish than the Irish themselves."

In a variant of the FitzGerald story, Áine is raped by Gerald's father the Earl of Desmond, who witnesses Áine combing her hair while bathing in a river. The Earl takes possession of Áine's cloak, which is the only way to control her, and he rapes her. Gerald FitzGerald is the product of their union, and Gerald exhibits certain magical abilities; he has the ability to dramatically change size (shrinks down to jump into a bottle), and he can transform into a goose, which he does at Lough Gur near Cnoc Áine. After Gerald's father dies, Áine and Gerald inherit his lands. Áine enchants the hillside of Cnoc Áine, causing peas to grow there miraculously overnight. In some versions of the story, Gerald is the king of the Sídhfir, is bound to a pillar in Loch Guirr, and according to Munster prophecy, will one day rise from the Loch mounted on a black steed with a white face to engage in combat during the final war.

Manannán mac Lir
In yet other versions of her myth, she is the wife or daughter of the sea god, Manannán mac Lir.

Oral Folklore 
In folklore from County Limerick, Áine is said to have two daughters whom she admonished never to marry. The first daughter disobeys her, and on her wedding night Áine finds her son-in-law eating the breast off her daughter. Áine forces her younger daughter to witness the horror and reinforces her warning about disobeying her mother, but the younger daughter soon elopes and runs off with a druid. Áine then shuts herself into her house as a recluse and will only commune with the Sidhe. She dies of grief on Saint John's Eve, and the good folk assemble in great masses bearing torches. It is said from this time on cliars were carried in the fields on Saint John's eve.

In other folklore from County Limerick, Áine was said to have lived in a fort in Cnoc Áine long ago. A woman gathered ash sticks from the fort, and Áine told her to put them back exactly as they were; when the woman failed to do so, Áine abducted her, carrying her into the fort. Áine is described as having long, flowing hair.

In another folktale, Áine was said to live at the bottom of a lake. Each year she would emerge at midsummer to sit in her favorite spot called Suidheachán Bean-a'-tighe, where she would comb her long golden hair with a golden comb. A young shepherd watched her from afar, and after she fell asleep he stole her comb. Every misfortune visited him after that, but before he died, he requested that the comb be thrown back into the lake.

People in Limerick once brought their sick to the lakes on the 6th night of the full moon (called "All-Heal") when the moon shone brightly on the waters. They believed that if the sick were not healed by the 8th or 9th night that Áine would sing or play the Ceol Sidhe, which was used to comfort the dying. Áine's red-haired dwarf brother Fer Fí, a harper, would then sing the Suantraige, which was the song that lulled the dead to sleep.

In The Legend of Seán Ó hAodh, the herdsman piper Seán Ó hAodh meets Áine, clothed in fine white robes, near Lough Gur in August, and she requests Seán to play at a ball. She meets Seán in a splendid horse-drawn carriage, and they travel over a long road laden with roses and fruit trees. When they arrive at Áine's mansion, Seán plays the pipes before fine ladies and gentlemen until the early morning hours, but when the sun rises, he sees fish shoaling outside the windows and realizes he is at the bottom of Lough Gur. At the end of the evening, the ladies and gentlemen give Seán guineas and Áine gives Seán a gold purse, and he falls asleep. He reawakens on Suidheachán Bean-a'-tighe to find that all the guineas have turned to gorse but that the gold purse that Áine gave him is still there and never runs empty.

Festivals
The feast of Midsummer Night was held in her honor. In County Limerick, she is remembered in more recent times as Queen of the Fae. On Saint John's Eve men used to gather on Cnoc Áine, where she was said to dwell, where they would light clíars - bunches of straw and hay tied on poles - that were carried in procession to the top of the hill. Later, the men ran with the clíars through their fields and between cattle to bring good luck for the rest of the year. Men who came from neighboring villages were said to be required to look to the moon as they approached the hill to avoid forgetting their homes.

Áine is spoken of as "the best hearted woman that ever lived" and the meadowsweet or queen-of-the-meadow is said to be her plant.

Related goddesses
Áine (Ir. "brightness, glow, joy, radiance; splendour, glory, fame") is sometimes mistakenly equated with Danu as her name bears a superficial resemblance to Anu.

"Aynia", reputedly the most powerful fairy in Ulster, may be a variant of the same figure. Áine's hill is located in the heart of Cnoc Áine (Knockainy) in County Limerick, is the hill of the goddess Grian, Cnoc Gréine.  Grian (literally, "sun") is believed to be either the sister of Áine, another of  Áine's manifestations, or possibly "Macha in disguise". Due to Áine's connection with midsummer rites, it is possible that Áine and Grian may share a dual-goddess, seasonal function (such as seen in the Gaelic myths of the Cailleach and Brigid) with the two sisters representing the "two suns" of the year:  Áine representing the light half of the year and the bright summer sun (an ghrian mhór), and Grian the dark half of the year and the pale winter sun (an ghrian bheag).

See also
 List of solar deities

References

Bibliography
 Byrne, Francis John, Irish Kings and High-Kings. Four Courts Press. 2nd revised edition, 2001.
Ellis, Peter Berresford, Dictionary of Celtic Mythology(Oxford Paperback Reference), Oxford University Press, (1994): 
MacKillop, James. Dictionary of Celtic Mythology. Oxford: Oxford University Press, 1998. .
O hOgain, Daithi "Myth, Legend and Romance: An Encyclopedia of the Irish Folk Tradition" Prentice Hall Press, (1991) :  (the only dictionary/encyclopedia with source references for every entry)
Wood, Juliette, The Celts: Life, Myth, and Art, Thorsons Publishers (2002):

External links

Photos of Cnoc Áine
Proto-Celtic — English lexicon

 
Love and lust deities
Love and lust goddesses